The Supreme Court of the Republic of Texas was the court of last resort for legal matters in the Republic of Texas from the Republic's independence from Mexico in 1836 until its annexation by the United States of America in 1846. The current Supreme Court of Texas was established that year.

Organization of the Court 
The Court was established by the Constitution of 1836, which created the Supreme Court and such inferior courts as the Texas Congress might from time to time establish.  The constitution also mandated that the Republic be divided into judicial districts, and that the district judges would serve as the associate judges on the Supreme Court, along with a Chief Justice.  The judges were elected by Congress for a term of four years. The district judges rode the circuit in their district during the spring and fall, leaving only the summer and winter for the judges to sit as the Supreme Court.

Jurisdiction 
The Court had unlimited appellate jurisdiction.  In the first statute establishing the district courts, Congress set $300 as the minimum amount in controversy for the appeal of a decision from the district court to the Supreme Court.  In 1841 the Court declared that limit unconstitutional in Morton v. Gordon and Alley, stating that all final judgments of the district courts were able to be appealed to the Supreme Court.  The same district court enabling act did not provide for appeal to the Supreme Court of criminal matters, which the Court resolved in Republic v. Smith, stating that the constitution gave jurisdiction to the Court over all criminal appeals.

Operation of the Court 
On December 15, 1836, the Texas Congress passed the implementing statute establishing the courts of Texas, and elected the chief justice and four district judges the next day.  The four district judges covered 22 counties and were ex officio members of the Supreme Court.  The court was to meet for one session a year, beginning on the first Monday in December, and required a majority of the judges to be present.  The opinions of the court are collected in a private reporter, Dallam's Decisions, in only one volume.

Justices of the Court

Chief Justices 
The Court had a Chief Justice and originally four district judges who served as associate judges.  This was expanded to five in 1838 and seven in 1840.  The first Chief Justice was James Collinsworth, who was an ally of Sam Houston, the president-elect of the new republic.  On Collinsworth's death, Houston appointed John Birdsall to the post.  When Mirabeau B. Lamar became president, Congress refused to confirm Birdsall and elected Thomas Jefferson Rusk instead.

In 1840, Rusk resigned and was replaced by John Hemphill, who served until the annexation of Texas..  The election in Congress was contested, with John Scott, former Solicitor General of North Carolina; James Webb, former U.S. District judge and Attorney General of Texas; and Hemphill all in the running for Chief Justice. Hemphill has been compared to John Marshall in laying down the legal foundation of Texas law, especially in the area of land titles, marital property, and homestead exemptions.

District judges 
The original four district court judges elected by Congress were Shelby Corzine, Benjamin Cromwell Franklin, Robert McAlpin Williamson, and James W. Robinson.  Due to delays in the Supreme Court sitting in session, these four judges (along with the first two chief justices) never sat with the Supreme Court.

Succession of seats

Sessions

1837 and 1839 

No session was held in 1837, probably because a majority of the judges were not present.  Two weeks after the Court was supposed to have met, Congress passed a statute which would impose a $1,000 fine on a judge who did not appear for a session.  A short time later, Congress eliminated the scheduled 1838 session when it moved the annual date to the second Monday in January.  In the meantime, Collinsworth died and Houston replaced him with Birdsall until Congress could meet and elect a new Chief Justice.  Rusk was elected, but did not receive word of his election until after the 1839 session had been scheduled to occur and been canceled for lack of a Chief Justice.

1840 
The first session in which the Texas Supreme Court met was the January 1840 session, in Austin.  The Court consisted of Chief Justice Rusk, and District Judges Shelby, W.J. Jones, Mills, and Hemphill.  The clerk was W. Fairfax Gray.  The court disposed of 49 cases on its docket, but issued only 18 opinions.  Thirteen cases were decided without opinion; the rest were continued to the following term.  The court issued what appear to be the first writ of mandamus and first writ of habeas corpus in Texas.

1841 

The January 1841 session was attended by Chief Justice Hemphill and District Judges Baylor, Hutchinson, Terrell, Scurry, and Hansford.  Gray was the clerk.  The District Judges from the First and Second Districts were not in attendance.

1842 
The January 1842 session was attended by Chief Justice Hemphill and District Judges Morris, Baylor, Hutchinson, Ochiltree, Jack, and Mills.  Thomas Green was the clerk.  The District Judge from the Second District did not attend.

1843 
The June 1843 session was attended by Chief Justice Hemphill and District Judges Morris, Baylor, Ochiltree, and Jack.  Green was the clerk.  The District Judges from the Second, Fourth, and Seventh Districts did not attend.

1844 
The June 1844 session was attended by Chief Justice Hemphill and District Judges Morris, W.J. Jones, Baylor, W.E. Jones, Ochiltree, and Jack.  Green was the clerk.  The District Judge from the Seventh District did not attend.

1845 
The December 1845 session was the last session of the Court. It was attended by Chief Justice Hemphill and District Judges J. B. Jones, W. J. Jones, Baylor, W. E. Jones, Wheeler, and Norton. Green was the clerk. The District Judge from the seventh district did not attend.

See also 

List of Supreme Court of the Republic of Texas cases

References

Footnotes

Notes

External links 
The Texas Supreme Court Historical Society

Texas
Texas state courts
Texas
Judiciary of the Republic of Texas
Defunct state courts of the United States
1836 establishments in the Republic of Texas
1840s disestablishments in Texas
Courts and tribunals established in 1836
Courts and tribunals disestablished in 1846